Standstill is a Spanish post-hardcore-band from Barcelona, formed in 1995.

Outside of Spain, most of their albums were published by Defiance Records. In Spain, the band's label used to be BCore Disc until they decided to go fully DIY with 2006's Vivalaguerra.

Discography

Albums
 2001: The Ionic Spell
 2002: Memories Collector
 2003: The Latest Kiss
 2004: Standstill (Defiance/ BCore)
 2006: Vivalaguerra
 2010: Adelante Bonaparte
 2013: Dentro de la Luz

Singles
 Standstill / Engrave split 7-inch, Defiance

References

External links 

 Standstill - Heroes de la turbulencia (German)

Spanish rock music groups
Post-hardcore groups
Musical groups established in 1995
Defiance Records artists